Sleeping on Trash: A Collection of Songs Recorded 2005–2010 is a compilation album by American rock band The Wonder Years.

Contents and release
The album is a compilation of all of The Wonder Years recordings prior to the release of The Upsides, with the exception of Get Stoked on It!. The compilation features 18 rare tracks, demos and cover songs. Vocalist Dan Campbell commented that the band "made it a priority to get music to listeners outside of [their albums]. Because of that, there are a lot of old tracks floating around from out-of-print 7 inches, CD-R demos or comps. Sleeping On Trash is a way [...] to get all of it on just one record. It’s a tangible way to own our old material without having to pay out the nose for it on eBay."

On November 27, 2012 Sleeping on Trash was announced for release. On February 8, 2013 the album was made available for streaming. On February 12, the album was released through No Sleep.

Track listing

Chart performance

References

External links

Sleeping on Trash: A Collection of Songs Recorded 2005–2010 at YouTube (streamed copy where licensed)

The Wonder Years (band) albums
No Sleep Records compilation albums
2013 compilation albums